McCalman Peak is the  summit of an east–west trending ridge  north of Crystal Hill, 3.97 km east-northeast of Gornik Knoll, 6.9 km south-southeast of Kumata Hill and 4.55 km west-southwest of Zaldapa Ridge on Trinity Peninsula, Antarctica. It was named by the UK Antarctic Place-Names Committee for Donald McCalman, a surveyor with the Falkland Islands Dependencies Survey at Hope Bay in 1958–59.

Map
 Trinity Peninsula. Scale 1:250000 topographic map.  Institut für Angewandte Geodäsie and British Antarctic Survey, 1996.

References

Mountains of Trinity Peninsula